Al Kelly was the stage name of Abraham Kalish (December 18, 1896,  – September 7, 1966), a U.S. vaudeville comedian. Kelly was known as a double-talk artist, and went on to stooge for other comedians such as Willie Howard and Ernie Kovacs. Near the end of his life, he made occasional appearances on The Soupy Sales Show when it was based in New York.

Biography
Born in Kreva, Russia, now Belarus, Kelly started in an act called Nine Crazy Kids, then started performing comic monologues. Early in his career, he performed largely in the Borscht Belt. When he was performing this stand-up comedy in the 1930s, he fluffed a joke so that it came out as nonsense: this got a good laugh so he made such double-talk the focus of his act and became especially known for this.

On television , Kelly was featured on Milton Berle's Texaco Star Theater, The Ed Sullivan Show, The Steve Allen Show, The Ernie Kovacs Show, The Jackie Gleason Show, The Dinah Shore Chevy Show, The Eddie Fisher Show, The Jack Paar Program, Candid Camera,  The Tonight Show starring Johnny Carson and the game show Back That Fact (1953). He was also an actor with supporting roles, such as in the film Singing in the Dark (1956) and in the TV series Mack & Myer for Hire (1963).

Kelly died at age 69 in the early hours of September 7, 1966 of a heart attack while sitting in the audience in the dining room at one of his favorite venues, The Friars' Club, in New York City, during a roast. On 8 September 1966, a crowded memorial service was conducted at Riverside Memorial Chapel (Amsterdam Avenue and 76th Street), New York City.

Legacy
 Al Kelly was referenced by Ben Katchor in a Julius Knipl, Real Estate Photographer strip as "Noel Kapish, the famous double-talk artist of the 1950s and 1960s" (a play on both "Kalish" and "capeesh?").
 Al Kelly was featured by Drew Friedman in his book Old Jewish Comedians (2006), "a collection of portraits of famous and forgotten Jewish comics of film and TV in their old age".
 Al Kelly was described by Marx Brothers screenwriter Irving Brecher in 2006: "Al did double talk. That was his style. He spoke gibberish in vaudeville sketches [...] most comedians couldn't do it like Al Kelly could. He was unique."

Further reading
Books
 Al Kelly's Double Life, "Unscrambled by" Alexander Rose (biographer), Frederick Fell Publishers, Inc., 1966. (GBOOK KTGbGQAACAAJ)

Notices
 "Al Kelly", in Billy H. Doyle (ed. Anthony Slide), The Ultimate Directory of Silent and Sound Era Performers: A Necrology of Actors and Actresses, Scarecrow Press, 1999, p. 296.
 "Kelly, Al V.", in Eugene Michael Vazzana, Silent Film Necrology (2nd ed.), McFarland, 2001, p. 280.
 "Al Kelly", in Frank Cullen, Vaudeville, Old & New: An Encyclopedia of Variety Performers in America, Vol. 1, Routledge, 2007, p. 621.

Articles
 "Al Kelly Is Dead; Famed Comedian; Double-Talk Expert Was in Show Business 52 Years", in The New York Times, 7 September 1966.
 "Al Kelly Funeral Today", in The New York Times, 8 September 1966.
 "Show Business Figures Hear Al Kelly Eulogized", in The New York Times, 9 September 1966.
 "Al Kelly, Double-Talking Comic Dies in N.Y. at 67; Overflow Crowd at Rites", in Variety, 14 September 1966.

Notes

References

External links
 

1896 births
1966 deaths
American male comedians
20th-century American comedians
Emigrants from the Russian Empire to the United States
People from Smarhon’ District
American people of Belarusian-Jewish descent
Belarusian Jews
Jews from the Russian Empire